Francisco Lozano (19 May 1932 – 11 November 2008) was a Mexican cyclist. He competed at the 1952 and 1956 Summer Olympics.

References

External links
 

1932 births
2008 deaths
Mexican male cyclists
Olympic cyclists of Mexico
Cyclists at the 1952 Summer Olympics
Cyclists at the 1956 Summer Olympics
Pan American Games medalists in cycling
Pan American Games silver medalists for Mexico
Pan American Games bronze medalists for Mexico
Competitors at the 1959 Pan American Games
Medalists at the 1959 Pan American Games
20th-century Mexican people
21st-century Mexican people